William Good may refer to:

William Good (Jesuit) (1527–1586), English Jesuit
William Charles Good (1876–1967), Canadian politician
William L. Good or Bill Good (1910–2007), American weightlifter

See also
William Goode (disambiguation)
William the Good (disambiguation)